Seaford Head is a   Local Nature Reserve east of Seaford in East Sussex. The rest is divided between Seven Sisters Country Park, which is owned and managed by East Sussex County Council, and an area owned by the National Trust.

The site has diverse habitats with chalk grassland, chalk cliffs, scrub, vegetated shingle, wet grassland, saltmarsh and rockpools. Grassland flora include kidney vetch, squinancywort, moon carrot and clustered bellflower. There are butterflies such as silver-spotted skipper, chalkhill blue and adonis blue.

References

Sussex Wildlife Trust
Local Nature Reserves in East Sussex